Anne Tønnessen (born 18 March 1974 in Flekkefjord) is a Norwegian footballer and Olympic champion.

She received a gold medal at the 2000 Summer Olympics in Sydney, playing for the Norwegian team. She played only the two first matches in the Olympics, as she became injured early in the second game against Nigeria, and was replaced by Bente Kvitland for the rest of the Olympics.

References

External links 
 
 
 

 

1974 births
Living people
Norwegian women's footballers
Footballers at the 2000 Summer Olympics
Olympic footballers of Norway
Olympic gold medalists for Norway
Toppserien players
Klepp IL players
Kolbotn Fotball players
People from Vest-Agder
People from Flekkefjord
Medalists at the 2000 Summer Olympics
Norway women's international footballers
Women's association footballers not categorized by position
2003 FIFA Women's World Cup players
1999 FIFA Women's World Cup players
Olympic medalists in football
Sportspeople from Agder